The British Columbia Law Enforcement Memorial is a memorial commemorating law enforcement professionals who died in the line of duty, in Victoria, British Columbia, Canada.

It was unveiled by then-Premier of British Columbia Gordon Campbell on 26 September 2004, and sits in the grounds of the British Columbia Parliament Buildings.

References

External links

 

2004 establishments in British Columbia
2004 works
Law enforcement memorials
Monuments and memorials in British Columbia
Outdoor sculptures in Victoria, British Columbia